A flag day is a flag-related holiday, a day designated for flying a certain flag (such as a national flag) or a day set aside to celebrate a historical event such as a nation's adoption of its flag.

Flag days are usually codified in national statutes passed by legislative bodies or parliaments; however, in some countries a decree or proclamation by the head of state or chief executive can also order a flag day. The statute, or the proclamation or decree, may specify locations where flags are to be flown and how (for example, at full- or half-staff); alternatively, custom may prevail. The flag day is naturally a flag flying day.

Specific flag days
Nations that are not broadly recognized sovereign states are shown in pink. Defunct states are highlighted in light grey.

See also

 Flag flying day
 National Day
 Republic Day
 Independence Day
 Public holiday

Notes

External links 
 

 
Types of national holidays
Flag flying days